Nathan Page (born 25 August 1971) is an Australian actor, best known for his commercial voice-over work and his role as Detective Inspector Jack Robinson in Miss Fisher's Murder Mysteries.

Early life 
Page grew up in an Air Force family and moved around Australia frequently as a child. A former cyclist, Page attended the Australian Institute of Sport with Stuart O'Grady and competed in Europe with Lance Armstrong. He retired from professional cycling at the age of 19 due to various injuries and because he could not remain competitive in Europe without performance-enhancing drugs. He recalled "It was an era that was plagued by drugs and it was very hard to see your way through to a long career... because I stayed clean, you could beat them some of the time, but not all of the time."

Describing his decision to take up acting after ending his cycling career, Page has said "I went into a wilderness for a while and had nothing to fall back on, then I decided to do something that was going to scare me". He began with "a little Tuesday night drama class" and graduated from the Centre for Performing Arts, Adelaide (now the Adelaide College of the Arts) in 1996.

Career 

In the first years of his acting career, Page primarily worked in theatre productions in Adelaide. He appeared in the films Strange Fits of Passion in 1999 and Sample People in 2000. In 2003, Page had a recurring role in the third series of The Secret Life of Us as Charlie, Richie Blake's boyfriend. In 2009, he was lauded for his performance as Ray "Chuck" Bennett in Underbelly: A Tale of Two Cities.

In 2011, he played Alasdair "Mac" Macdonald, the husband of Ita Buttrose in Paper Giants: The Birth of Cleo, an ABC mini-series about Buttrose's life.  After the series aired, Macdonald sued the ABC for defamation for erroneously depicting him as deserting his family.  Scenes of Page's performance in Paper Giants were played in court as evidence. The ABC later issued a formal apology to Macdonald.

In 2012, Page co-starred as Detective Inspector Jack Robinson in the first series of Miss Fisher's Murder Mysteries opposite Essie Davis, with whom he had appeared in a stage production of MacBeth in Adelaide in July 1998. Miss Fisher has been very successful, with an average of more than 1.5 million viewers per episode in Australia and global distribution in more than 120 territories.  The ABC aired the second and third series of Miss Fisher in 2013 and 2015.

In 2013, Page played Henry Stokes in Underbelly: Squizzy on Nine Network. In 2015, he played Koz Krilich in Hiding on the ABC.

In 2016, Page returned to the stage for the first time in ten years. He played Vinnie in The Distance with the Melbourne Theatre Company and starred as Robert Hannay in The 39 Steps with the State Theatre Company of South Australia in Adelaide.

A photograph of Page, titled The Chameleon IV, 2015 by Sydney-based photographer Sam McAdam-Cooper, was a finalist for the National Photographic Portrait Prize in 2016.  Finalist photographs were displayed at the National Portrait Gallery in Canberra and were exhibited throughout Australia in 2016 and 2017.

Page also works as a voice actor.  He has voiced numerous television commercials for such companies as BMW, Kubota Tractor Corporation, and ASICS, as well as the Royal Australian Navy.

Nathan was cast as a lead actor in the 2020 film Miss Fisher and the Crypt of Tears.

He is also in the thriller film Escape from Pretoria, filmed in Adelaide in March 2019.  It was released on 6 March 2020.

Personal life
Page lives outside of Adelaide with his wife, New Zealand dancer and choreographer Sarah-Jayne Howard, and their two sons, Duke and Frankie.

Filmography

Television

Film

Theatre

References

External links 

 Nathan Page: the official Nathan Page website. 
 Nathan Page on Instagram.

Australian male actors
Living people
Australian male cyclists
1971 births